The Indian cricket team toured Australia from 8 to 31 January 2016 to play two tour matches, five One Day International (ODI) and three Twenty20 International (T20I) matches. The full schedule for the tour was announced by Cricket Australia on 9 July 2015.

Australia won the ODI series 4–1. The series broke the record for the most runs scored in a bilateral ODI series of five matches or fewer, with a total of 3,159. Eleven centuries were also scored in the ODI series, which was also a record. India won the T20I series 3–0 and became the number one ranked team in the ICC T20I Championship.

Squads

Mohammed Shami was ruled out of the tour with a hamstring injury. He was replaced by Bhuvneshwar Kumar for the ODI matches and Jasprit Bumrah for the T20I matches. John Hastings was added to Australia's squad to replace Mitchell Marsh for the second ODI. Usman Khawaja was added to Australia's squad to replace David Warner for the second and third ODIs who left the group on paternity leave. Nathan Lyon and David Warner were added to Australia's squad for the 4th and 5th ODIs. Joel Paris and Usman Khawaja were both dropped. Bhuvneshwar Kumar was ruled out of the T20 series due to a thumb injury. He was replaced in the squad by Rishi Dhawan. Cameron Bancroft was added to Australia's squad for the third T20I as a replacement for Matthew Wade. Shane Watson replaced Aaron Finch as captain of Australia's team for the last T20I match, due to Finch being injured.

Tour matches

T20: Western Australia XI v Indians

One Day: Western Australia XI v Indians

ODI series

1st ODI

2nd ODI

3rd ODI

4th ODI

5th ODI

T20I series

1st T20I

2nd T20I

3rd T20I

References

External links
 Series home at ESPN Cricinfo

2016 in Australian cricket
2016 in Indian cricket
International cricket competitions in 2015–16
Indian cricket tours of Australia
2015–16 Australian cricket season